Israel–Uganda relations refers to the current and historical relationship between Israel and Uganda. Neither country has a resident ambassador. Uganda has a non resident ambassador in Cairo.

History
In 1903, the British Uganda Programme proposed Uganda as a Homeland for the Jewish people.

Postcolonial relationship

Under Milton Obote, Uganda helped Israel support rebels in Southern Sudan during their long war with the north. At some point Obote wanted to make peace with the Khartoum government and cut off support to the rebels. When Idi Amin overthrew Obote in 1971, he restarted support for the rebels and continued the military relationship with Israel.

Amin visited Israel in 1971 and was toasted by Israeli Defence Minister Moshe Dayan. The Israelis were responsible for supplying and training much of the Ugandan Army and for undertaking several construction projects in the country. But in February 1972, Amin suddenly decided to visit Libya (while traveling on an Israeli jet) and meet with leader Colonel Gaddafi. After the visit, Amin became much more vocally anti-Israel.

By March 1972, Amin had ordered all Israelis expelled from Uganda. One report says Amin became enraged over Israel's refusal to supply Uganda with jets for a war with neighboring Tanzania. Amin became an outspoken critic of Israel. By the end of the month, all the Israelis had gone, including some who had driven all their valuable construction equipment across the border into Kenya.

Entebbe hijacking
Operation Entebbe was a counter-terrorism hostage-rescue mission carried out by the Israel Defense Forces (IDF) at Entebbe Airport in Uganda on the night of 3 July and early morning of 4 July 1976. In the wake of the hijacking of Air France Flight 139 and the hijackers' threats to kill the hostages if their prisoner release demands were not met, a plan was drawn up to airlift the hostages to safety. These plans took into account the likelihood of armed resistance from Ugandan military troops. Originally codenamed Operation Thunderbolt by the IDF, the operation was retroactively renamed Operation Yonatan in memory of the Sayeret Matkal commander Lieutenant Colonel Yonatan "Yoni" Netanyahu, who was killed by a Ugandan sniper. Three hostages, seven hijackers, and 45 Ugandan soldiers were killed. In addition to the death of Netanyahu, five other Israeli commandos were wounded. A fourth hostage was killed by Ugandan army officers at a nearby hospital.

21st century
In 2016, an Israeli company was chosen to make a national master plan for the development of Uganda, on the basis of the Israeli National Outline Plan system, namely National Outline Plan 35.

Judaism in Uganda
The Abayudaya are a Baganda community in eastern Uganda living in several villages near the town of Mbale who practise Judaism. Although they are not genetically or historically related to other ethnic Jews, they are devout in their practice of the religion, keeping their version of kashruth, and keeping Shabbat. Most of these are recognized by the Reform and Conservative sects of Judaism. However, the villagers of Putti are still seeking an Orthodox conversion and practise strict Orthodox Judaism. Their population is estimated at approximately 1,100, having once been as large as 3,000 (prior to the persecutions of the Idi Amin regime); like their neighbors, they are subsistence farmers. Most Abayudaya are of Bagwere origin, except for those from Namutumba who are Basoga. They speak Luganda, Lusoga or Lugwere, although some have learned Hebrew as well.

In November 2017 Chabad had opened a permanent Jewish center in Uganda, becoming the 100th country to host a Chabad center.

Agricultural cooperation
In a joint Israeli–Ugandan project, a professor from the Hebrew University of Jerusalem's Faculty of Agriculture conducted a survey of Lake Victoria with a Ugandan colleague from Makerere University. They found that Nile perch, introduced by the British sixty years ago, have decimated native fish populations, leading to malnutrition in the lakeside communities. She helped to set up artificial fish ponds to raise carp, which had disappeared from the local diet. The United States Agency for International Development sponsored the digging of the ponds and sent villagers to Kibbutz HaMa'apil in Emek Hefer to learn spawning techniques. Graduates of the training program established carp farms.

High level visits

In 1966, Prime Minister Levi Eshkol made a state visit to Uganda.

Ugandan President Yoweri Museveni has visited Israel twice since coming to power in 1986; in 2003, he met with Prime Minister Ariel Sharon and Foreign Minister Benjamin Netanyahu to primarily discuss arms deals between the two countries. In 2011, Museveni again visited Israel. His visit was facilitated by former Pensioner Affairs Minister and head of the Mossad turned international businessman Rafi Eitan, who had several investments in Uganda including a cattle farm. Eitan and Museveni are close friends. In February 2020, Israeli Prime Minister Benjamin Netanyahu visited Uganda.

See also
African Jews
History of the Jews in Uganda
International recognition of Israel

References

 
Uganda
Bilateral relations of Uganda